Jose Javelona Sison (April 25, 1963 – April 16, 2022), professionally known as Boyet Sison, was a Filipino sports commentator and news anchor.

Early life and education
Boyet Sison was born as Jose Javelona Sison on April 25, 1963, in Manila, to Ady Sison and Rebecca Javelona. He attended Lourdes School of Mandaluyong.

Career
Also referred to as "Papa B" in the broadcast industry, Sison began his career as a disc jockey for numerous clubs in Metro Manila. In the 1990s, Sison had a break in his career when he guest-hosted in Saturday Night Live of DWRT 99.5. In 2000, Sison became a radio play-by-play panelist for games of the Philippine Basketball Association (PBA) and went on to work as the coliseum announcer for the PBA from 2005 to January 2012. He also was the ring announcer for the Universal Reality Combat Championship and an anchor for the National Collegiate Athletic Association.

Sison co-hosted the ANC television sports program Hardball with Bill Velasco and the DZMM radio show Fastbreak with basketball legend Freddie Webb until the program went on-hiatus due to the COVID-19 pandemic.

His last television stint was in flagship newscast TV Patrol, as the host of the segment "Alam N'yo Ba?" where he replaced Kim Atienza for the role in November 25, 2021. He would continue hosting the segment until his passing.

Death
Sison died on April 16, 2022, at age 58, just nine days before his 59th birthday. He died due to a cardiac arrest after undergoing intestinal surgery two days earlier while confined at the De Los Santos Medical Center in Quezon City.

Filmography

Television
Hardball (2006–2020) (ANC)
Fastbreak (2014–2020) (DZMM TeleRadyo)
Gametime (2018–2020) (ANC)
TV Patrol – "Alam N'yo Ba?" segment (2021–2022) (Kapamilya Channel/A2Z)

Radio
Saturday Night Live (Late 1990s) (DWRT-FM)
Fastbreak (2014–2020) (DZMM-AM)

References

1963 births
2022 deaths
People from Manila
Filipino radio personalities
Filipino television sportscasters
ABS-CBN people
Filipino television news anchors